Bianca Langham-Pritchard (born 29 May 1975) is an Australian field hockey international. She played in the 1998 World Cup-winning Australian team.

Born in Hobart, Tasmania, Langham-Pritchard was first selected in the Australian national women's team, the Hockeyroos in November 1994. She was a member of the 1996 and 2000 Olympic Training Squads, but did not make the final team. In 1998, she won gold at both the World Cup and Commonwealth Games. She played her 100th game for Australia in 1999.

References

1975 births
Living people
Australian female field hockey players
Sportspeople from Hobart
Sportswomen from Tasmania
Commonwealth Games medallists in field hockey
Commonwealth Games gold medallists for Australia
Commonwealth Games bronze medallists for Australia
Field hockey players at the 1998 Commonwealth Games
Medallists at the 2002 Commonwealth Games